José Nieto (born 6 November 1958) is a Venezuelan footballer. He played in two matches for the Venezuela national football team in 1987. He was also part of Venezuela's squad for the 1987 Copa América tournament.

References

External links
 

1958 births
Living people
Venezuelan footballers
Venezuela international footballers
Place of birth missing (living people)
Association football midfielders